Kovil Esanai (East) is a village in the Ariyalur taluk of Ariyalur district, Tamil Nadu, India.

Demographics 

 census, Kovil Esanai (East) had a total population of 2049 with 1014 males and 1035 females.
The main occupation is agriculture. The local population have a variety of religious beliefs.
It consists of two villages which are Kovil esanai east and Kovil esanai west. The west is known as Vilagam. Kovil esanai demography is made up of mainly Udaiyar community and sizeable moopanar and servai (also known as Muthuraja)community. It is by far a peaceful village with agriculture being the main occupation of people here. Farming is dependent on Pullambadi Vaaikkal which is channel branching out from Cauvery.

References 

Villages in Ariyalur district